Custar is a village in Wood County, Ohio, United States. The population was 179 at the 2010 census.

History
Custar was originally called Lewisburg, and under the latter name was platted in 1865, and named for Frederick Lewis, proprietor. A post office called Custar has been in operation since 1866. The village was incorporated in 1881.

In late 2019, three grain silos in Custar suffered from a fire and explosion.

Geography
Custar is located at  (41.284188, -83.844376).

Demographics

2010 census
As of the census of 2010, there were 179 people, 73 households, and 45 families living in the village. The racial makeup of the village was 94.4% White, 0.6% Native American, 2.2% from other races, and 2.8% from two or more races. Hispanic or Latino of any race were 6.1% of the population.

There were 73 households, of which 31.5% had children under the age of 18 living with them, 52.1% were married couples living together, 4.1% had a female householder with no husband present, 5.5% had a male householder with no wife present, and 38.4% were non-families. 30.1% of all households were made up of individuals, and 9.6% had someone living alone who was 65 years of age or older. The average household size was 2.45 and the average family size was 3.13.

The median age in the village was 32.2 years. 25.7% of residents were under the age of 18; 7.2% were between the ages of 18 and 24; 33.5% were from 25 to 44; 22.8% were from 45 to 64; and 10.6% were 65 years of age or older. The gender makeup of the village was 52.0% male and 48.0% female.

2000 census
As of the census of 2000, there were 208 people, 72 households, and 58 families living in the village. The population density was 830.2 people per square mile (321.2/km2). There were 73 housing units at an average density of 291.4 per square mile (112.7/km2). The racial makeup of the village was 98.08% White, 0.48% Native American, 1.44% from other races. Hispanic or Latino of any race were 3.37% of the population.

There were 72 households, out of which 40.3% had children under the age of 18 living with them, 65.3% were married couples living together, 13.9% had a female householder with no husband present, and 19.4% were non-families. 19.4% of all households were made up of individuals, and 12.5% had someone living alone who was 65 years of age or older. The average household size was 2.86 and the average family size was 3.22.

In the village, the population was spread out, with 27.4% under the age of 18, 11.5% from 18 to 24, 33.2% from 25 to 44, 16.8% from 45 to 64, and 11.1% who were 65 years of age or older. The median age was 35 years. For every 100 females there were 89.1 males. For every 100 females age 18 and over, there were 86.4 males.

The median income for a household in the village was $37,813, and the median income for a family was $39,583. Males had a median income of $32,083 versus $21,964 for females. The per capita income for the village was $16,508. About 8.3% of families and 12.9% of the population were below the poverty line, including 23.1% of those under the age of eighteen and 16.7% of those 65 or over.

References

Villages in Wood County, Ohio
Villages in Ohio